The 1999 Swisscom Challenge singles was the singles event of the sixteenth edition of the Swisscom Challenge; a WTA Tier I tournament and the most prestigious tournament held in Switzerland. Lindsay Davenport was the two-time defending champion, but she did not compete this year.

Venus Williams won in the final 6–3, 6–4 against home player and World No. 1 Martina Hingis.

Seeds
The top four seeds received a bye to the second round.

Qualifying draw

Draw

Finals

Top half

Bottom half

Qualifying

Seeds

Qualifiers

Lucky loser
  Henrieta Nagyová

Qualifying draw

First qualifier

Second qualifier

Third qualifier

Fourth qualifier

External links
 WTA tournament details
 ITF tournament details

Zurich Open
1999 WTA Tour